Sky Park Manor is a twelve-story, luxury apartment building built in 1963 by Selmer A. Solheim and Olson Construction in Lincoln, Nebraska. The apartment building is listed on the National Register of Historic Places for its architectural significance as emblematic of the International Style of architecture.

References

Buildings and structures in Lincoln, Nebraska
National Register of Historic Places in Lincoln, Nebraska
1963 establishments in Nebraska
Residential buildings completed in 1963